Sajakorpi is a Finnish surname. Notable people with the surname include:

Ismo Sajakorpi (born 1944), Finnish television writer, screen writer, and television director
 (born 1976), Finnish actor

Finnish-language surnames